The Royal Patriotic Fund Corporation (also known as the Royal Pat) was a charitable body set up by Royal Warrant in the United Kingdom during the Crimean War. It provided assistance to the widows, orphans and other dependants of members of the armed forces. Under The Royal Patriotic Fund (Transfer Of Property, Rights And Liabilities) Order 2005 these responsibilities were transferred to RPFC, a charitable company limited by guarantee.

The fund has both a General Council and a smaller Executive Committee, which handles the daily running of the organisation.

The fund was reorganized by the Patriotic Fund Reorganisation Act 1903.

RPFC was registered as a charity by the Charity Commission for England and Wales on 6 April 2005 and removed from the register on 23 September 2011.

Representatives
Representatives have included
Admiral Cyprian Bridge; 1906 to 1912; Admiralty Representative
David Charles Ross Heyhoe Esq; 1998 
John Fraser Esq OBE; 1998

References

 
19th-century establishments in the United Kingdom
Organizations established in the 1850s
Charities based in England
Crimean War